The 2005–06 Mestis season was the sixth season of the Mestis, the second level of ice hockey in Finland. 11 teams participated in the league, and Jukurit won the championship. The season was played with only 11 teams because KalPa got promoted to SM-liiga at the end of last season.

Standings

Playoffs

Qualification

Hermes got relegated to Suomi-sarja. Haukat gave up their place in Mestis without relegation matches. Top three teams of the relegation series got promoted.

External links
 Season on hockeyarchives.info

Fin
2005–06 in Finnish ice hockey
Mestis seasons